Maxillaria variabilis, the variable maxillaria, is a species of orchid ranging from Mexico to Panama, and probably Guyana.

References

External links 

variabilis
Orchids of Central America
Orchids of Belize
Orchids of Mexico
Orchids of Panama